Leonardo Ángel Biagini (born 13 April 1977) is an Argentine retired footballer who played as a striker.

Most of his professional career was spent in Spain where he arrived at the age of 18, going on to represent six clubs in more than one decade with totals of 244 games and 43 goals, 145 matches and 18 goals being in La Liga.

He was part of Atlético Madrid's squad when they conquered the double in 1996, although he did not feature prominently with the team. In 2007, in his 30s, he returned to his country.

Football career
Born in Arroyo Seco, Santa Fe, Biagini started his career at Newell's Old Boys in the Primera División, in 1993. In 1995, he was a main part of the Argentina under-20 team that won the FIFA World Cup in Qatar.

Biagini signed for Atlético Madrid at just 18, being an important attacking element as the capital club won the double in his first year. He was mainly and regularly used as a substitute for compatriot Juan Esnáider and Kiko during his spell and, after a poor second season, moved to fellow league side CP Mérida in the summer of 1997, where he would be eventually relegated.

Biagini then played five seasons with RCD Mallorca where, safe for his first year where he scored a career-best 11 goals (also helping the team to the final of the 1998–99 UEFA Cup Winners' Cup by scoring the 1–0 winner against Chelsea in the last-four's second leg, in a 2–1 aggregate victory), he would be very scarcely used due to several injury problems, also serving a six-month loan to England's Portsmouth in the First Division, where he found the net against Millwall and Wimbledon.

Biagini returned to Spain and Mallorca for the 2002–03 campaign, being part of the side than won Copa del Rey – even though he did not appear in any matches – and being subsequently released. After four additional years in the Spanish second division, in representation of three teams, he returned home and joined Arsenal de Sarandí.

Honours

Club
Atlético Madrid
La Liga: 1995–96
Copa del Rey: 1995–96

Mallorca
Supercopa de España: 1998

Arsenal Sarandí
Copa Sudamericana: 2007

International
Argentina
FIFA U-20 World Cup: 1995

Individual
South American Youth Football Championship Top Scorer: 1995 (4 goals)

References

External links
Argentine League statistics  

Football-Lineups profile

1977 births
Living people
People from Rosario Department
Argentine footballers
Association football forwards
Argentine Primera División players
Newell's Old Boys footballers
Arsenal de Sarandí footballers
La Liga players
Segunda División players
Atlético Madrid footballers
CP Mérida footballers
RCD Mallorca players
Rayo Vallecano players
Sporting de Gijón players
Albacete Balompié players
English Football League players
Portsmouth F.C. players
Argentina youth international footballers
Argentina under-20 international footballers
Argentine expatriate footballers
Expatriate footballers in Spain
Expatriate footballers in England
Argentine expatriate sportspeople in Spain
Argentine expatriate sportspeople in England
Sportspeople from Santa Fe Province